Julien Forêt (born 21 August 1982) is a French professional golfer.

Early life
Forêt was born in the French colony of New Caledonia. He began playing golf at age twelve.

Professional career 
Forêt turned professional in 2006 at the age of 23. He began playing on the Challenge Tour, the European Tour's developmental tour, and won the Golf Open International de Toulouse. Forêt's successful start to his professional career continued when he came through 2006 European Tour Qualifying School to earn a place on the European Tour for 2007. However he then suffered a slump in form. In 2007 Forêt made only two cuts on the European Tour. He returned to the Challenge Tour for 2008 but only made four cuts. Since then he has played mainly on the third-tier Alps Tour.

Professional wins (2)

Challenge Tour wins (1)

Challenge Tour playoff record (1–0)

Alps Tour wins (1)

Team appearances
Amateur
Eisenhower Trophy (representing France): 2004
European Amateur Team Championship (representing France): 2005

See also
2006 European Tour Qualifying School graduates

External links

French male golfers
New Caledonian male golfers
European Tour golfers
People from Nouméa
1982 births
Living people